Castroverde de Campos is a municipality located in the province of Zamora, Castile and León, Spain. According to the 2021 census (INE), the municipality has a population of 272 inhabitants.

Notable people 

Diego de Ordaz (born 1480), Spanish Captain who accompanied Hernán Cortés on his expeditions.

Local cuisine 
Castroverde de Campos is home of restaurant Lera, awarded with 1 Michelin star in 2021.

References

Municipalities of the Province of Zamora